Bryan Wallace Berard (born March 5, 1977) is an American former professional ice hockey defenseman. Berard was the first overall pick in the 1995 NHL Entry Draft by the Ottawa Senators. He is most noted for a debilitating eye injury he received early in his career. Berard underwent several operations, and played 619 games in his NHL career despite the seriousness of the injury.

Playing career

Junior career
Berard was born in Woonsocket, Rhode Island. He began his junior career playing for Mount St. Charles Academy in Rhode Island. He won three championships with the school before departing after his third year. Berard had offers to join Boston College, University of Maine or University of Michigan hockey programs, but chose to go the Ontario Hockey League (OHL). Berard was drafted by the Detroit Junior Red Wings of the OHL. and won the OHL Championship with the team in the 1994–95 season and made the league's first all-star team. He was also named the league's rookie of the year, only the third defenceman to win the trophy.

Entry draft and New York Islanders
Berard was drafted first overall by the Ottawa Senators in the 1995 NHL Entry Draft. As the first overall pick – and with the Senators blue line among the weaker in the league, Berard anticipated going straight to the National Hockey League. However, after his first training camp with the team, he was returned to junior hockey. Concerned about his development with the club, Berard requested a trade. In January 1996, the Senators traded him in a trade with the New York Islanders that saw his rights, along with those of Wade Redden, Martin Straka, Don Beaupre and Damian Rhodes move between the teams.

Berard joined the Islanders for 1996–97 season and made an immediate impact. With 48 points in his rookie season, he led all defensemen on the team, and finished ninth league-wide in scoring amongst defensemen. He was rewarded for his efforts in 1997 by winning the Calder Trophy as the top rookie in the NHL, edging out Jarome Iginla. He also played for the United States in the 1998 Winter Olympics. The team finished sixth in the tournament. After four years with the Islanders, the team was concerned with his ability to play defense and were in search of a proven goaltender. The Islanders traded Berard to the Toronto Maple Leafs in exchange for goaltender Félix Potvin in January 1999.

Toronto Maple Leafs and injury
Berard put up 19 points in 38 games with the Maple Leafs, and played 17 more contests in the post season. In his second year with the club, he had 30 points in 64 games when on March 11, 2000, during a game against the Senators in Ottawa, the stick of the Senators' Marián Hossa clipped Berard in the right eye on a follow through. The eye was severely slashed on the sclera which resulted in a retinal tear and a detached retina. In the hospital after the incident, after being told he might lose his eye, Berard reportedly told his friends that he would play hockey again. Despite that optimism, he received a $6.5 million settlement from his insurance company, for what many considered to be a career-ending injury.

Berard missed the 2000–01 season and underwent seven eye operations, improving his vision in the eye to 20/600. He started working out again in April 2001 and started skating again months thereafter. Berard was later fitted with a contact lens that allowed him to meet the league's minimum vision requirement of 20/400. He became an unrestricted free agent in 2001.

Free agency
When it became apparent that he might play again, the Maple Leafs stated they were interested in his services, but Berard opted to play for a team that was currently rebuilding and was a bit closer to his home of Woonsocket. Upon signing a tryout contract with the New York Rangers, he returned his insurance settlement and risked a comeback to the NHL. He played well enough that his tryout contract turned into a $2 million contract for the 2001–02 season, plus two one-year options that could have turned it into a $9.75 million pact. However, his option was not exercised by the Rangers after a disappointing season where he only scored 2 goals and 23 points despite playing in all 82 games for the Rangers.

Berard then inked a one-year deal with an option for a second year to join the Boston Bruins. With Boston, Berard began to return to his pre-injury form posting ten goals and 38 points, his highest total since his second year in the league. Despite his success, the Bruins balked when an arbitrator awarded Berard a $2.51 million contract and they walked away from the ruling, making him an unrestricted free agent.

The Chicago Blackhawks offered him a $2.01 million deal and signed him to a one-year contract. In Chicago, Berard's game continued to improve and he finished the year second on the team in scoring with 47 points, just one off his career best. He capped his year by being awarded the Bill Masterton Trophy for his dedication to hockey. With his career seemingly on the upswing, the Blackhawks and Berard agreed on a one-year $3 million contract for the 2004–05 campaign. Blackhawks general manager Bob Pulford was eager to have him back, saying "His point production was right up there with the best defensemen. He excels on the power play and that's a huge part of the game now. It was important for us to get him under contract." But the season was ultimately cancelled due to the 2004–05 NHL lockout, and with a new general manager replacing Pulford, Berard was not tendered an offer for the 2005–06 season.

As a free agent, Berard landed a two-year deal with the Columbus Blue Jackets. Columbus GM Doug MacLean felt that Berard's skillset was a perfect fit for his club, saying "Bryan brings a level of speed to our blue line that we've never had in the past," adding, "With a more wide-open game coming in the NHL, Bryan should really flourish and we're excited about what he adds to our hockey team." While Berard had overcome the limitations of his vision to become a solid offensive defensemen, his time in Columbus would be marred by troubles with his back. His first season with the Blue Jackets saw him post impressive numbers with 12 goals and 32 points in just 44 games but a back injury - and subsequent surgery - shut him down in March. In October, when he should have been gearing up for his second year with the club, he had another surgery to repair a herniated disc in his back and managed to play just eleven games with the Jackets. In late February, just before the trade deadline, the team waived Berard, ending his time in Columbus.

Berard accepted an invitation to attend training camp for the 2007–08 season with the Islanders, and performed well enough to earn a one-year contract with them. In his first game back with his original NHL team, Berard scored the game-winning goal in a 2–1 Islander victory against another of his former teams, the Rangers. Berard managed just five goals and 22 points that season.

European career and retirement
Prior to the start of the 2008–09 NHL season, Berard was invited to training camp with the Philadelphia Flyers. He was not offered a contract despite tallying three assists in Philadelphia's camp. Berard signed on November 16, 2008, with Vityaz Chekhov of the Kontinental Hockey League (KHL). He scored 17 points in 25 games played. Berard retired after the 2008–09 season due to problems with his back.

Post retirement
Berard lives in Greenwich Village, Manhattan. He appeared in 2011 on the Battle of the Blades, a CBC Television program.

He was a victim along with many other NHL players of a scam run by financial advisor Phil Kenner. Kenner was eventually sentenced to 17 years in jail for the scam.

Positive drug test
In early 2006, it was revealed that he had tested positive for an anabolic steroid known as 19-norandrosterone, in a drug test he had taken in November 2005. He was the first NHL player ever to test positive for steroids. The NHL did not hand down any form of suspension to Berard, as they did not administer the test, but he was banned from international play for two years effective January 3, 2006. Berard said after the incident, "I made a mistake that resulted in a suspension and, while unintentional, I take full responsibility. I became aware of this problem after the fact, and for that, I am disappointed in myself."

Awards and honors
 NHL All-Rookie Team, 1997
 Calder Memorial Trophy, 1997
 Bill Masterton Memorial Trophy, 2004
 Inducted into the Rhode Island Hockey Hall of Fame, 2018

Career statistics

Regular season and playoffs

International

See also
List of sportspeople sanctioned for doping offences

References

External links

1977 births
Living people
American expatriate ice hockey players in Canada
American expatriate sportspeople in Russia
American men's ice hockey defensemen
American sportspeople in doping cases
Battle of the Blades participants
Bill Masterton Memorial Trophy winners
Boston Bruins players
Calder Trophy winners
Chicago Blackhawks players
Columbus Blue Jackets players
Detroit Junior Red Wings players
Detroit Whalers players
Doping cases in ice hockey
American expatriate ice hockey players in Russia
HC Vityaz players
Ice hockey players from Rhode Island
Ice hockey players at the 1998 Winter Olympics
National Hockey League first-overall draft picks
National Hockey League first-round draft picks
New York Islanders players
New York Rangers players
Olympic ice hockey players of the United States
Ottawa Senators draft picks
People from Woonsocket, Rhode Island
Sportspeople with a vision impairment
Toronto Maple Leafs players